Elmer Ellsworth Yoter  (June 26, 1900 – July 26, 1966) was an American professional baseball third baseman. He played parts of four seasons in Major League Baseball between 1921 to 1928 for the Philadelphia Athletics, Cleveland Indians and Chicago Cubs. In 36 MLB games, he collected 24 hits with two doubles and two triples, hitting .250 with 12 runs batted in.

Yoter, a native of Plainfield, Pennsylvania, spent 21 seasons as a minor league manager, much of that time in the farm system of the Boston Red Sox, compiling a record of 1,331-1,220 (.522). He also was a longtime scout for the Bosox.

He died in Camp Hill, Pennsylvania, at age 66.

External links
, or Retrosheet

1900 births
1966 deaths
Baseball players from Pennsylvania
Boston Red Sox scouts
Chicago Cubs players
Cleveland Indians players
Columbus Red Birds players
Columbus Senators players
Danville Veterans players 
Danville-Scholfield Leafs players
Gloversville-Johnstown Glovers players
Greenwood Dodgers players
Houston Buffaloes players
Indianapolis Indians players
Major League Baseball third basemen
Minneapolis Millers (baseball) players
Minor league baseball managers
Norfolk Tars players
Petersburg Trunkmakers players
Philadelphia Athletics players
Portsmouth Cubs players
Portsmouth Truckers players
Saginaw Aces players
Wilkes-Barre Barons (baseball) players
Scranton Miners players
Toronto Maple Leafs (International League) managers